Haney Corner is an unincorporated community in Shelby Township, Ripley County, in the U.S. state of Indiana.

History
A post office called Haney's Corner was established in 1871, and remained in operation until it was discontinued in 1905.

Geography

References

Unincorporated communities in Ripley County, Indiana
Unincorporated communities in Indiana